The Writers' Federation of Nova Scotia was established in 1975 to foster creative writing and the profession of writing in Nova Scotia. They administer the East Coast Literary Awards, which includes Thomas Head Raddall Award, J.M Abraham Poetry Award and the Evelyn Richardson Non-fiction Award. The WFNS also administers the Nova Writes Competition for Unpublished Manuscripts and the Writers' in the Schools Program. They also organize workshops and professional development sessions for writers in Nova Scotia.

External links
 Writers' Federation of Nova Scotia

Canadian writers' organizations
Professional associations based in Nova Scotia